Kelly Hardeman is a Philippine-born American basketball player.

Early life and education
Hardeman was born on February 25, 1994 to American missionary parents at the St. Luke's Medical Center in Quezon City, Philippines. She spent her childhood in Antipolo, Rizal where she attended Faith Academy for her high school studies.

She went to the United States to study at the Azusa Pacific University for her collegiate studies.

Basketball career

Early career
Hardeman played basketball for her high school, Faith Academy. After her high school stint, she was scouted by Patrick Aquino who convinced her to play for the National University varsity team. However, she opted to play collegiate basketball in the United States instead with Azusa Pacific University. She averaged 19.1 points, 9.6 rebounds, and 2.1 blocks playing with Azusa in the Pacific West Conference of the National Collegiate Athletic Association Division II.

Azusa Pacific statistics

Source

Professional
She played with Danish club BK Amager in the EuroLeague. A starting player, she averaged 14.4 points and 10.5 rebounds.

International
The handlers of the Philippines women's national basketball team has been campaigning for the granting of Hardeman, Filipino citizenship through naturalization so she could be eligible to play for the national team.

References

American women's basketball players
Azusa Pacific Cougars women's basketball players
1994 births
Basketball players from Quezon City
People from Antipolo
Living people